"I Wanna Be Your Lady" was the first single released from the Hinda album of Hinda Hicks and features Shaznay Lewis on vocals. It charted at 109 and peaked on #14 on the UK Singles Chart.

Track listing

References

1997 singles
Hinda Hicks songs
1997 songs
Songs written by Michelle Escoffery